Cristián Marcelo Muñoz Corrales (born July 15, 1983) is a Chilean football manager and former footballer who played as a midfielder.

Club career
He began his career in Universidad de Chile, then played on a loan in Cobreloa, then in Santiago Wanderers.
In January 2010, it was announced that Corrales will play in Greek Championship of Beta Ethniki. Corrales was transferred to Ilioupoli F.C. He finished the season with fifteen appearances and three goals.

At the end of 2021 season, A.C. Barnechea announced the retirement of Muñoz from the football activity as a professional footballer.

International career
Muñoz represented Chile at several youth levels, the most important of these is the 2003 South American U-20 Championship, without luck, in the category of Sudamericano of Uruguay. A part of that team together with Claudio Bravo, Mark González, Mauricio Pinilla, Gonzalo Fierro, Luis Jiménez, Jorge Valdivia, Miguel Pinto, Marco Estrada, Luis Pedro Figueroa, Miguel Aceval and Eduardo Rubio.

Managerial career
Following his retirement as a professional player, he coached free agents at the SIFUP (Professional Footballers' Trade Union). On second half 2022, he took his first challenge as head coach in a professional club after joining Santiago Morning in the Primera B de Chile.

Personal life
He is nicknamed La Nona, a spanish form of Nonna (grandmother in Italian). This nickname was given by his teammate Gamadiel García when he was 21 years old, due to the fact that he had many wrinkles in the face.

Honours

Club
Universidad de Chile
Primera División: 2004 Apertura

Barnechea
Segunda División Profesional: 2016-17

References

External links

1983 births
Living people
Footballers from Santiago
Chilean footballers
Chilean expatriate footballers
Chile under-20 international footballers
Universidad de Chile footballers
Cobreloa footballers
Santiago Wanderers footballers
Santiago Morning footballers
Puerto Montt footballers
Deportes Melipilla footballers
José Gálvez FBC footballers
Total Chalaco footballers
Ilioupoli F.C. players
Coquimbo Unido footballers
Sport Boys footballers
Deportes Iberia footballers
Rangers de Talca footballers
A.C. Barnechea footballers
Unión San Felipe footballers
Chilean Primera División players
Peruvian Primera División players
Football League (Greece) players
Primera B de Chile players
Segunda División Profesional de Chile players
Chilean expatriate sportspeople in Peru
Chilean expatriate sportspeople in Greece
Expatriate footballers in Peru
Expatriate footballers in Greece
Chilean football managers
Santiago Morning managers
Primera B de Chile managers
Association football midfielders